Karl Jacobs (born July 19, 1998), formerly known as GamerBoyKarl, is an American Twitch streamer and YouTuber. He rose to prominence as a member of MrBeast's on-screen cast. He would later develop his own videos, primarily Minecraft content. Jacobs is the creator of the anthology series Tales from the SMP set in the Dream SMP, which will be adapted into a series of comic books published by Dark Horse Comics. He is also a co-host of the Banter podcast with fellow YouTubers Sapnap and GeorgeNotFound.

Career 
Jacobs began streaming on Twitch in 2017, playing Roblox under the name GamerBoyKarl. In 2019, he was hired as a video editor for YouTuber MrBro. Jacobs then became a cameraman for MrBro's brother, YouTuber MrBeast, before transitioning into a member of MrBeast's on-screen cast. During a video for MrBeast Gaming, Jacobs met Minecraft YouTuber Dream, and was later invited to join his server, the Dream SMP.

Jacobs created the online anthology series Tales from the SMP, which explores the story of characters in the Dream SMP by following Jacobs' time-travelling character to various times and locations throughout the server. The series has featured internet personalities such as Lil Nas X, Dream, and Corpse Husband. The season two pilot, titled "The Maze," premiered on February 11, 2022. In August 2022, Jacobs announced that stories from his series Tales from the SMP would be adapted as a series of comic books titled Time Traveler Tales for Dark Horse Comics. The comic books will be written by Dave Scheidt and illustrated by Kelly and Nichole Matthews.

In September 2021, Jacobs started a podcast with fellow Minecraft YouTuber Sapnap titled Banter. Following the release of the first episode, which featured MrBeast, Banter briefly overtook The Joe Rogan Experience as the number one podcast on Spotify. On August 6, 2022, GeorgeNotFound publicly debuted as the third host on the podcast. 

In March 2022, Jacobs was announced to be the creative ambassador for shoe retailer Journeys.  On November 9, the game Once Upon a Jester was launched on Steam, with Jacobs voicing several characters. On November 14, 2022, Jacobs released his first animated short titled Beside Myself. The short featured Jacobs as writer and producer, Elenor Kopka as animator and director, and Richie Woods as music composer.

Awards and nominations

References 

Living people
American YouTubers
Twitch (service) streamers
Minecraft YouTubers
American podcasters
1998 births